Thorup (or Torup) is the name of at least thirteen villages and towns in Denmark and is also used as a surname. The name Thorup ends on "rup" (rup, strup, torp, and drup are all descended from an old Scandinavian designation for a group of houses), which means that it originates from the late Viking Age, circa AD 1000. The name Thorup may refer to:

People
 Børge Thorup (born 1943), Danish football player
 Jess Thorup (born 1970), Danish football player and manager
 Jørgen Thorup (born 1950), Danish fencer
 Kirsten Thorup (born 1942), Danish author
 Majken Thorup (born 1979), Danish swimmer
 Mikkel Thorup (born 1965), Danish computer scientist
 Peter Thorup (1948–2007), Danish musician
 Stanley N. Thorup (1929-1997), American lawyer, judge, and politician
 Thurop Van Orman (born 1976), American animator

See also
 Torup, Halland, Sweden

Sources
 A Danish document on place names

Populated places in Denmark
Danish-language surnames